Stanford University School of Engineering is one of the schools of Stanford University. The current dean is Jennifer Widom, the former senior associate dean of faculty affairs and computer science chair. She is the school's 10th dean.

List of deans
 Theodore J. Hoover (1925–1936)
 Samuel B. Morris (1936–1944)
 Frederick E. Terman (1944–1958)
 Joseph M. Pettit (1958–1972)
 William M. Kays (1972–1984)
 James F. Gibbons  (1984–1996)
 John L. Hennessy  (1996–1999)
 James D. Plummer (1999–2014)
 Persis Drell (2014–2016)
 Thomas Kenny (interim dean) (2016–2017)
 Jennifer Widom (2017–current)

Current departments at the school
 Aeronautics and Astronautics
Bioengineering and Chemical Engineering (also in the School of Medicine)
 Chemical Engineering
 Civil and Environmental Engineering
 Computer Science
 Stanford Department of Electrical Engineering
 Materials Science and Engineering
 Management Science and Engineering
 Mechanical Engineering

In addition, the Institute for Computational and Mathematical Engineering is an interdisciplinary program.

History 
The School of Engineering was established in 1926, when Stanford organized the previous independent academic departments into a school. The original departments in the school were:
 Civil Engineering, one of the original university departments (1891), later to become Civil and Environmental Engineering
 Stanford Department of Electrical Engineering, taught as a subject, prior to being established in 1894
 Mechanical Engineering, one of the original university departments
 Mining and Metallurgy, established in 1918 and eventually disbanded in 1945

Departments added afterwards:
 Aeronautics and Astronautics, started as Aeronautical Engineering in 1958
 Chemical Engineering in 1961 (split from Chemistry)
 Computer Science in 1965 in the School of Humanities and Sciences, but moved to the School of Engineering in 1985
 Materials Science and Engineering in 1961 (originally known as Materials Science)
 Management Science and Engineering in the 1950s (originally Industrial Engineering)
 Bioengineering in 2002

See also
 Engineering
 Glossary of engineering
 Stanford Center for Computers and the Law
 Stanford Engineering Everywhere

References

External links
 School of Engineering official website

 
Engineering universities and colleges in California
Educational institutions established in 1925
1925 establishments in California